Lourdes María Rodríguez de Flores  is a Salvadoran public figure who served as the First Lady of El Salvador from 1999 until 2004. She is the widow of former President of El Salvador Francisco Flores, with whom she had two children.

Rodríguez publicly denounced charges of corruption against her husband, former President Flores, who died in a coma in 2016 while awaiting trial. She told local Salvadoran media at the time, "He suffered a terrible health crisis, provoked by this unjust political attack."

References

Living people
Date of birth missing (living people)
First ladies of El Salvador
1959 births